University City High School can refer to:
University City High School (Philadelphia)
University City High School (San Diego)
University City High School (Missouri)